Russell Carter may refer to:
 Russell Carter (American football), American football player
 Russell Carter (basketball), American basketball player
 Russell Kelso Carter, American Christian minister, professor, and songwriter
 Russell Gordon Carter, American author